Hahnenkamm (Spessart) is a ridge of hills in the northwest of the Spessart range of Bavaria, Germany. It has an elevation of up to 435.5 m above NHN.

Geography

Location
Hahnenkamm lies east of Alzenau in the district of Aschaffenburg in the far northwest of the state of Bavaria. It is part of the Mittelgebirge Spessart (more precisely the Vorspessart) and is located between the Kahlgrund, the valley of the river Kahl, and the Untermainsenke, the valley of the river Main.

Schanzenkopf is part of the Hahnenkamm.

Etymology
Hahnenkamm means rooster's comb in German. The name likely derives from the ridge's quite small width (for a Mittelgebirge) and the blocks of quartzite sticking up out of it.

References

External links

Hills of Bavaria
Hills of the Spessart
Aschaffenburg (district)